Robert Watson Pomeroy (June 21, 1902 – January 4, 1989) was an American businessman and politician from New York.

Early life
He was born on June 21, 1902, in Buffalo, New York, the son of Robert Watson Pomeroy, Sr. (1868–1935), a Yale graduate who was an industrialist and financier in Buffalo and New York, and Lucy (née Bemis) Pomeroy (1869–1958), a former president of the Palmetto Garden Club.   He attended the Hotchkiss School. He graduated with a Ph.B. from Yale University in 1924.

His paternal grandparents were Elizabeth (née Watson) Pomeroy, and Congressman Theodore M. Pomeroy (1824–1905) who served as the 26th Speaker of the House following Schuyler Colfax and was a close friend of U.S. Secretary of State (under Lincoln) William H. Seward.

Career
After graduating from Yale, he engaged in the management of investments.  During World War II he served in the U.S. Army, attaining the rank of captain. After the war he entered politics as a Republican.

Pomeroy was a member of the New York State Assembly (Dutchess Co.) from 1948 to 1964, sitting in the 166th, 167th, 168th, 169th, 170th, 171st, 172nd, 173rd and 174th New York State Legislatures. He was a leading conservationist, and was Chairman of the Joint Legislative Committee on Natural Resources from 1959 to 1965.

He was a member of the New York State Senate in 1965 and 1966; and a delegate to the New York State Constitutional Convention of 1967.

Personal life
In 1930, he married Estelle Condit Bassett (1907–1988), the daughter of Carroll Phillips Bassett and Margaret (née Condit) Bassett. Together, they were the parents of two children:

 Marnie Pomeroy (b. 1932), a Sarah Lawrence College graduate who moved to Ottawa, Canada and co-founded The Ladysmith Press.
 Robert Watson Pomeroy III (b. 1935)

He died on January 4, 1989, at his home in Millbrook, New York, of heart failure; and was buried at St. Peter's Episcopal Cemetery in Lithgow.

References

External links

The Auburn, NY Pomeroy Anvil Monument

1902 births
1989 deaths
People from Millbrook, New York
Republican Party members of the New York State Assembly
Republican Party New York (state) state senators
Yale University alumni
United States Army officers
Businesspeople from Buffalo, New York
20th-century American politicians
Politicians from Buffalo, New York
20th-century American businesspeople